Promotone BV is a company of the English rock band The Rolling Stones which owns their recordings. It is one of a group of Stones-related companies based in Netherlands for tax purposes.

Promotone's headquarters is in Amsterdam, Netherlands. The company's activities are officially activities categorized as: environmental services, culture, recreation and other services.

References

 

The Rolling Stones
Companies based in Amsterdam